Government Engineering College, Madhubani is a government engineering college in Madhubani district of Bihar Near Pandaul On the Madhubani-Sakri Highway. It was established in the year 2019 under Department of Science and Technology, Bihar. It is affiliated with Aryabhatta Knowledge University,Patna and approved by All India Council for Technical Education.

Admission 
Admission in the college for four years Bachelor of Technology course is made through UGEAC conducted by Bihar Combined Entrance Competitive Examination Board. To apply for UGEAC, appearing in JEE Main of that admission year is required along with other eligibility criteria.

Departments 

College has three branches in Bachelor of Technology course with following annual intake.

References

External links 
 
 BCECE Board website
 Aryabhatta Knowledge University website
 DST, Bihar website

Engineering colleges in Bihar
Colleges affiliated to Aryabhatta Knowledge University
Engineering education in India
2019 establishments in Bihar
Educational institutions established in 2019